This is an incomplete list of commemorative coins of Russia.

Silver 3 Rubles 
1993 - ballerina

Silver 25 rubles 
1993 - ballerina
1994 - ballerina
 3 rubles - silver - Monastery of Raifa - 2005
 3 rubles - silver - Kazan train station - 2007
 3 rubles - silver - Moscow subway station - 2005
 3 rubles - silver - Russakov House of Culture - 2005
 3 rubles - silver - St. Nicholas Cathedral - 2005
 1 ruble - silver - Armed Forces - 2005
 10 rubles - bi-metallic brass/cupronickel - Dorogobuzh - 2003
 10 rubles - bi-metallic brass/cupronickel - Kasimov - 2003
 10 rubles - bi-metallic brass/cupronickel - Pskov - 2003
 10 rubles - bi-metallic brass/cupronickel - Murom - 2003
 3 rubles - silver - Epiphany Cathedral - 2004
 1 ruble - silver - great bustard - 2004
 10 rubles - bi-metallic brass/cupronickel - Kem - 2004
 10 rubles - bi-metallic brass/cupronickel - Ryazhsk - 2004
 1 ruble - silver - rush toad - 2004
 3 rubles - silver - 250 years Lomonosov University - 2005
 50 rubles - gold - 60th anniversary of victory in World War II - 2005
 3 rubles - bi-metallic brass/cupronickel - 300th anniversary Monetary Reform/Peter I - 2004
 10 rubles - bi-metallic brass/cupronickel - Dmitrov - 2004
 1 ruble - silver - Asiatic wild dog - 2005
 10 rubles - base metal - Kaliningrad - 2005
 10 rubles - bi-metallic brass/cupronickel - Kazan - 2005
 3 rubles - silver - Kazan Opera & Ballet Theatre - 2005
 2 rubles - silver - 100th anniversary birth of M. Sholokhov - 2005

See also 
 List of commemorative coins of Russia (1992)
 List of commemorative coins of Russia (1993)
 List of commemorative coins of Russia (1998)
 List of commemorative coins of Russia (2009)
 List of commemorative coins of the Soviet Union

External links 
 Bank of Russia. Commemorative coins
 All coins of Russian